The Faces of My Gene is a 2018 Chinese fantasy adventure comedy film co-written and directed by Guo Degang and starring Yue Yunpeng and Lin Chi-ling. The film premiered in China on 16 February 2018. The film picks up the story of a writer and his ancestors after he crosses ancient times.

Plot
Bei Xiaobei (Yue Yunpeng) is a self abased writer because he feels himself too fat. Because of his poor appearance, he often ran into a wall in real life. Later, he unwittingly finds a long dusty family tree. And accidentally crosses through the ages to meet with his ancestors.

Cast
Yue Yunpeng as Bei Xiaobei, a writer
Lin Chi-ling as Liya, Bei Xiaobei's love interest
Wu Xiubo as Mei Qiantu
Wu Jing as Mei Banfa, a Ming dynasty swordsman
Wang Baoqiang as Erdangjia
Dong Chengpeng as Xiao Zhuge
Sandra Ng as Nüwa, Bei Xiaobei's mother
Eddy Ou as Mei Xingfu, a professor during the Republic of China
Du Chun as Mei Xiwang, a Qing dynasty scholar
Zhang Guoli as Doctor Bei, Bei Xiaobei's father
Ma Su as Lily, a singer
Zhang Li as Zi An
Yu Qian as Feng Jiuye
Guo Qilin as Wang Baobao, Mei Banfa's junior fellow apprentice.
Fan Bingbing as Bei Xiaobei's ancestor
Guo Degang as Bei Xiaobei's ancestor
Jing Boran as Lei, a writer
Li Chen as Zhang Baishun, a Jin dynasty imperial physician
Zheng Kai as Lei's broker
 Jia Nailiang as Wang Xiao'er, a martial artist
Jam Hsiao as Gonggong
Wu Yue as Kuafu
Jiro Wang as Zhurong
Huang Lei as the boss of the publishing house
Sean Sun as the host
Jia Ling as a woman
Evonne Hsieh as Mei Qiantu's wife
Meng Fei 
Xie Nan as the female reporter
Wang Xiaoli as Shennong
Chang Chen-kuang as Zi An's father
Liu Bei as Tong Tiechui
Sun Yue as the Emperor's uncle
Hu Shanshan as Wang Gangtie, Mei Xingfu's fiancée

Soundtrack

Production
The Faces of My Gene is the comedian-turned director Guo Degang's directorial debut.

A total of 33 celebrities joined the cast during filming, including Wu Xiubo, Wu Jing, Wang Baoqiang, Fan Bingbing, Sandra Ng, Zhang Guoli, and Ma Su.

Release
The film was released on February 16, 2018 in China.

The film received mainly negative reviews.

Box office
The Faces of My Gene collected more than 100 million yuan on its opening weekend.

References

External links

Chinese adventure comedy films
Chinese fantasy comedy films
Films set in ancient China
Films set in the Jin dynasty (266–420)
Films set in the Ming dynasty
Films set in the Qing dynasty